Emmanuelle Heidsieck (born in 1963) is a French writer and journalist.

Biography
Heidsieck is the author of several novels and collections of short stories, combining literary research and socio-political surveys. Her works address the problems of undocumented migrants (Territoire interdit), unemployment (Bonne année), the suffering at work caused by the mutation-privatization of public services (Notre aimable clientèle), the operations of private insurers against social security and To install a system of discriminatory insurance (Il risque de pleuvoir), the social conflict seen as salutary and invigorating (Vacances d'été), the altruistic and disinterested gesture increasingly suspect in a world where everything becomes merchant (À l'aide ou le rapport W).

A specialist in social issues, she was a permanent journalist with Le Monde Initiatives (social supplement of the group Le Monde). She has contributed to Politis, Actualités sociales hebdomadaires and Viva (mutualist magazine).

Graduatered from Sciences Po Paris and Columbia University, she also holds a master's degree in law.

Emmanuelle Heidsieck won the 2006 Prix Contrepoint for Notre aimable clientèle

Works 
2013: 

2011: Vacances d'été, Léo Scheer
1990: 

2008: Il risque de pleuvoir, Éditions du Seuil
2005: Notre aimable clientèle, Éditions Denoël
1999: Bonne année, Du Toit, Collection of short stories on unemployment.
1995: Territoire interdit, Syros, Collection of short stories on undocumented migrants (translated into several languages).

External links 
 Emmanuelle Heidsieck on Babelio
 Emmanuelle Heidsieck on France Culture
 Le rapport W d’Emmanuelle Heidsieck on Mediapart (18 September 2013)
 Emmanuelle Heidsieck, À l’aide ou le rapport W
 Emmanuelle Heidsieck on Éditions Leo Scheer
 Emmanuelle Heidsieck - À l'aide ou le rapport W on YouTube

1963 births
Living people
20th-century French writers
21st-century French writers
French women journalists
French women short story writers
French short story writers
Sciences Po alumni
Columbia University alumni
Writers from Paris
20th-century French women writers
21st-century French women writers